Liona Maria Carolynne Boyd,  (born 11 July 1949) is a classical guitarist often referred to as the First Lady of the Guitar.

Music career

Early years
Boyd was born in London and grew up in Toronto. Her father grew up in Bilbao, Spain, and her mother in Stoke-on-Trent, England. Her grandmother was from Linares, Spain, the birthplace of the "king of the classical guitar", Andrés Segovia. During her family's first of two ocean voyages to Canada she made her debut performance playing "Bluebells of Scotland" on a treble recorder in a talent show on the ship.

When she was thirteen, she was given her first guitar, a Christmas present which her parents had bought in Spain seven years earlier. She took lessons from Eli Kassner, Narciso Yepes, Alirio Díaz, Julian Bream, and Andrés Segovia.

Boyd received a Bachelor of Music degree from the University of Toronto in 1972, graduating with honours. After graduation she studied privately for two years with Alexandre Lagoya in Paris.

Performing
In 1975, she performed at Carnegie Hall in New York City. Andrés Segovia sent her a note that said "through your beauty and talent you will conquer the public, philharmonic or not." During the same year, she toured northern British Columbia and Yukon. She also toured as the opening act for with Canadian folk singer Gordon Lightfoot.

Recordings
In 1974, Boyd released her debut album, The Guitar. It was produced by Eleanor Koldofsky and was released on Boot Records. The record was distributed internationally by London Records. In 1976, Boyd joined Society of Composers, Authors and Music Publishers of Canada, and established her own publishing company, Mid-Continental Music. In 1989, her album Christmas Dreams appeared on the RPM 100 Top Albums chart. To date she has three platinum and four gold albums in Canada.

As of 2018, she has recorded 26 studio albums, made a live recording from Tokyo, created over 25 music videos, and produced three compilation recordings.

During her career, Boyd has recorded with Chet Atkins, Eric Clapton, Al Di Meola, Rik Emmett, David Gilmour, Alex Lifeson, Steve Morse, the Canadian Brass, André Gagnon, Yo Yo Ma, Frank Mills, Strunz & Farah, Roger Whittaker, Gheorghe Zamfir, Pavlo, Jesse Cook, and Olivia Newton-John.

Recordings
In 1995, Liona contributed to the Canadian Windows 3.1 computer game The Music Game.

Personal life
In 1988, Stoddard Publishing of Toronto, Canada published Boyd's autobiography In My Own Key: My Life in Love and Music. In it she revealed her eight-year romance with former Canadian Prime Minister Pierre Trudeau. In 1992, Boyd moved to Beverly Hills, California, where she married John B. Simon, a real estate developer.

Following a diagnosis of musician's focal dystonia after the release of Camino Latino, Boyd was compelled to change how she plays guitar. She reinvented herself by developing her songwriting and singing skills and playing less demanding guitar arrangements.

After divorcing in 2004 she relocated to Miami and started a guitar duo with Srdjan Gjivoje. In 2007 she moved to New Canaan, Connecticut, to make a record with him called Liona Boyd Sings Songs of Love. They subsequently toured together. She released a new age album titled Seven Journeys which was co-written with her producer Peter Bond. In 2010, she lived in California once more. In 2011, she purchased a house in Palm Beach, Florida but made her home base in Toronto where she recorded 3 more albums produced by Peter Bond. She and accompanist Michael Savona toured Canada extensively. In 2016, Liona formed a new touring duo with Andrew Dolson.

In August 2017, Dundurn Press reissued Boyd's first memoir In My Own Key and published her second memoir, No Remedy for Love.

One of the many revelations in his book was that Boyd claims to have played a private concert for jurors at the murder trial of O.J. Simpson in the mid-1990s. This was at the request of judge Lance Ito who Boyd says was a big fan of her music.

In 2017, Liona filmed "A Winter Fantasy", a live Christmas special that was broadcast in December 2018 on several PBS stations including WNED-TV in Buffalo, New York.

In 2018, Blackstone Publishing released an audiobook of Liona reading her autobiography In My Own Key.

Awards and honours
 Instrumental Artist of the Year, Juno Awards, five times
 Gallery of the Greats, Guitar Player Magazine
 Classical Guitar Musician of the Year, Guitar Player, five times
 Order of Canada, Member: 1982, Officer: 2021
 Order of Ontario, 1991
 Vanier Award, 1978
 Prix Esprit du Ciècle
 Diamond Jubilee Award, 2013
 JoAnn Falletta competition Lifetime Achievement, 2018
 National Guitar Museum Lifetime Achievement Award, 2019

Discography

References

External links

 Official site
 Liona Boyd: Biography
 "Liona Boyd: five years of healing, two new albums, one rebirth" The Globe and Mail

1949 births
Living people
Canadian classical guitarists
Canadian women guitarists
Members of the Order of Canada
Members of the Order of Ontario
University of Toronto alumni
English emigrants to Canada
Musicians from London
Juno Award for Instrumental Album of the Year winners
Canadian people of Spanish descent
Women classical guitarists
Columbia Records artists
RCA Records artists
London Records artists
Officers of the Order of Canada